Al Miller (November 23, 1921 – July 28, 1978) was an American race car driver.

Born Albert Krulac in Detroit, Michigan, Miller died in Mount Clemens, Michigan.  He drove in the USAC Championship Car series, racing in the 1962, 1963, 1965–1967 and 1970 seasons, with 31 career starts, including the Indianapolis 500 races in 1963 (in a John Crosthwaite designed car) and 1965 to 1967.  He finished in the top ten 5 times, with his best finish in 4th position in the 1965 Indianapolis 500.

He was not related to Al Miller, who raced at Indianapolis in the 1930s and 1940s.

Indianapolis 500 results

References

1921 births
1978 deaths
Indianapolis 500 drivers
Racing drivers from Detroit